The 1987 Oklahoma State Cowboys football team represented the Oklahoma State University in the 1987 NCAA Division I-A college football season. The Cowboys finished the regular season with a 9–2 record. Thurman Thomas was in his senior year for the Cowboys.  In his career at Oklahoma State, Thomas had 897 rushes for 4,595 yards, 43 touchdowns, and 21 100-yard rushing games.  He was also a Heisman Trophy candidate and a first team selection on the College Football All-America Team in 1987. In the 1987 Sun Bowl, Thomas ran for 157 yards and four touchdowns in the 35–33 victory over West Virginia, keeping Barry Sanders on the sidelines for the majority of the game.  Thomas left OSU as the school's all-time leading rusher and his number 34 is one of only three jerseys retired at Oklahoma State. Sanders replaced Thomas as starter the next year in 1988.

Schedule

Personnel

Game summaries

Colorado

OSU - Sanders 4 Run (Blanchard kick)
OSU - Dykes 18 Gundy (Blanchard kick)
COL - Simmons 7 Run (Hannah kick)
COL - Hannah 32 FG
OSU - Williams 16 Gundy (Blanchard kick)
OSU - Thomas 5 Run (Blanchard kick)
COL - Bieniemy 6 Run (Hannah kick)
OSU - Limbrick 3 Run (Blanchard kick)
OSU - Sanders 73 punt return (Blanchard kick)
Passing: COL Aunese 5/11, 90 Yds, INT, OSU Gundy 21/28, 257 Yds, 2 TD, INT
Rushing: COL Flannagan 9/52, OSU Thomas 23/110
Receiving: COL Carl 3/61, OSU Dykes 8/114, TD

After the season

The 1988 NFL Draft was held on April 24–25, 1988. The following Cowboys were selected.

Awards and honors
Thurman Thomas, Heisman Trophy finalist
Thurman Thomas, All-America selection

References

Oklahoma State
Oklahoma State Cowboys football seasons
Sun Bowl champion seasons
Oklahoma State Cowboys football